Year 1056 (MLVI) was a leap year starting on Monday (link will display the full calendar) of the Julian calendar.

Events 
 By place 

 Byzantine Empire 
 August 31 – Empress Theodora (a sister of the former Empress Zoë) dies after a 18-month reign, by a sudden illness at Constantinople. She is succeeded by Michael VI (the Old), who had served as military finance minister under the former Emperor Romanos III. Michael is appointed through the influence of Leo Paraspondylos, Theodora's most trusted adviser. This ends the Macedonian Dynasty.
 Theodosius, a nephew of the former Emperor Constantine IX, tries to usurp the Byzantine throne, and liberates all the prisoners who flock to his banner. With their support, he marches through the streets of Constantinople to the Palace. There, the Varangian Guard forms outside to stop him. Theodosius loses heart and heads for Hagia Sophia. Later he is captured, and exiled to Pergamum.

 Europe 
 October 5 – Emperor Henry III (the Black) dies after a 10-year reign at Bodfeld, an imperial hunting lodge (Königspfalz) in the Harz Mountains. He is succeeded by his 5-year-old only son Henry IV as "king of the Germans" and enthroned by Pope Victor II (also a German) at Aachen – while his mother, Empress Agnes of Poitou, becomes co-regent.
 Ottokar I, count of Steyr, becomes margrave of the Karantanian March (later known as Styria).

 Britain 
 June 16 – In response to the attack on Hereford Cathedral (see 1055), Leofgar the bishop of Hereford takes an army into Wales to deal with the Welsh prince Gruffydd ap Llywelyn. He along with a large number of English troops is killed in battle at Glasbury-on-Wye by the Welsh. Earl Harold Godwinson raises an army to take revenge, but comes to peaceful terms with Gruffydd.

 Northern Africa 
 Battle of Tabfarilla in present day Mauritania: The Almoravids are crushed by the Godala and their Emir 
 Yahya ibn Umar al-Lamtuni falls.

 By topic 
 Religion 
 The Pagoda of Fogong Temple in Shanxi in northern China is built during the Liao Dynasty. Work begins on the Pizhi Pagoda of Lingyan Temple in Shandong under the opposing Song Dynasty.
 Dromtön, an Atiśa chief disciple, founds Reting Monastery in the Reting Tsangpo Valley (north of Lhasa) as the seat of Kadam lineage of Tibetan Buddhism.
 The Muslims expel 300 Christians from Jerusalem, and European Christians are forbidden to enter the Church of the Holy Sepulcher.

Births 
 Abdallah ibn Buluggin (the Conqueror), emir of Granada
 Al-Muqtadi, caliph of the Abbasid Caliphate (d. 1094)
 Baldwin II of Mons, count of Hainaut (approximate date)
 Ermengol IV (or Armengol), Spanish nobleman (d. 1092)
 Fujiwara no Kiyohira, Japanese nobleman and samurai (d. 1128)
 Hildegarde of Burgundy, French noblewoman (approximate date)
 Ibn Tahir of Caesarea, Arab scholar and historian (d. 1113)
 Nestor the Chronicler, Russian monk and historian (d. 1114)
 Sæmundur Sigfússon, Icelandic priest and scholar (d. 1133)
 William II (or William Rufus), king of England (d. 1100)
 Zhou Bangyan, Chinese bureaucrat and ci poet (d. 1121)

Deaths 
 February 10 – Æthelstan (or Athelstan), bishop of Hereford
 February 11 – Herman II (or Heriman), archbishop of Cologne
 June 16 – Leofgar (or Leovegard), bishop of Hereford
 August 31 
 Odda of Deerhurst, English nobleman
 Theodora, empress of the Byzantine Empire
 September 10 – William, margrave of the Nordmark
 October 5 – Henry III (the Black), Holy Roman Emperor (b. 1017)
 November 25 – Flann Mainistreach, Irish poet and historian
 Áed Ua Forréid, bishop of Armagh (Church of Ireland)
 Anselm of Liège, French chronicler (approximate date)
 Benedict IX, pope of the Catholic Church (approximate date)
 Ekkehard IV, Swiss monk and chronicler (approximate date)
 Hilal al-Sabi', Buyid historian, bureaucrat and writer
 Leo of Ohrid, Byzantine archbishop and theologian
 Yahya ibn Umar al-Lamtuni, Almoravid chieftain

References